A Bold Fresh Piece of Humanity: A Memoir is a memoir by American political commentator Bill O'Reilly, published in 2008.

It was published on September 23, 2008. It recounts his early life and includes his accounts of people who influenced him. It opened at number 2 on the New York Times Best Seller List.
The book spent 8 weeks on New York Times Best Sellers, Hardcover Nonfiction list.

References

External links 
Book on O'Reilly's Official Website

2008 non-fiction books
American autobiographies
Books by Bill O'Reilly (political commentator)
Broadway Books books